The 2015 California Vulcans football team represented California University of Pennsylvania during the 2015 NCAA Division II football season.

Schedule

Game summaries

at Virginia State

Bloomsburg

Shippensburg

at Edinboro

Seton Hill

at Slippery Rock

at IUP

No. 25 Clarion

at Gannon

Mercyhurst

at Lock Haven

References

California
California Vulcans football seasons
California Vulcans football